The Abhinava Gada (Sanskrit:अभिनवगदा);, is a Sanskrit work on Dvaita philosophy written by Satyanatha Tirtha. It is a refutation work for the theological controversies provoked by Appayya Dikshita's on Madhva Siddhanta.

Contents
Abhinava-Gada consists of five-chapters designated Yuddhas (battles) with an obvious allusion to the Gada-yuddha between Bhima and Suyodhana. The intensely bellicose attitude of the author reflected even in the opening verse:

Overview
Abhinava-Gada is an uncompromisingly fighting treatise directed to a sustained and systematic refutation of Appayya Dikshita's furious, frontal attack on Madhva in his Madhvamukhamardanam. Even though it is refutation work like the earlier works of Vijayendra Tirtha and Narayana, Satyanatha wrote the refutation in a slightly different angle of theirs. It runs to 4,750 granthas and was published by Satyadhyana Tirtha of Uttaradi Math. Unlike Vijayendra Tirtha, the author tries to silence the criticism of Appayya Dikshita, without reference, as a rule, to the opinions expressed by Jayatirtha and Vyasatirtha in their works. He isolates Madhva from his commentators and so confounds the critic, suggesting sometimes that the Bhashyakara is not be blamed for the views of his commentators. Vijayendra Tirtha, on the other hand, has throughout tries to treat the works of the Bhashyakara and those of his commentators, as a homogeneous whole and make them withstand the criticisms of Dikshita, as a united body of texts. Anthony Grafton and Glenn W. Most writes, "The work Abhinava-Gada is a new mace which broke the heads of non-dualists like Appayya Dikshita".

References

Bibliography
 

Dvaita Vedanta
Philosophical literature
Sanskrit texts